The Church of Jesus Christ of Latter-day Saints (LDS Church) held its first congregation in North Dakota in 1919. In 2021, there was 11,287 members in 26 congregations.

Official church membership as a percentage of general population was 1.49% in 2017. According to the 2014 Pew Forum on Religion & Public Life survey, less than 1% of North Dakotans self-identify themselves most closely with the LDS Church. The LDS Church is the 7th largest denomination in North Dakota.

History

The first missionaries of the LDS Church arrived in North Dakota in 1885, and the first LDS meetinghouse was built in 1919 in Sully Lake. However the first stake in North Dakota was not organized until 1977 in Fargo. North Dakota was the final US state to have a stake within its boundaries.

During the North Dakota oil boom, the LDS Church in North Dakota saw significant growth in multiple communities in the western part of the state. The growth was largely driven by the influx of out-of-state oil field workers and their families from other nearby western states with high Latter-day Saint populations. In some of the communities, church membership doubled during the oil boom necessitating the construction of multiple new meetinghouses, chapels, and other church facilities.

The number of missionaries from the church sent to the Dakotas doubled during the pandemic, as many sent to other countries returned to the US.

Stakes
As of February 2023, the following stakes had congregations located in North Dakota:

Missions
The South Dakota Rapid City Mission was consolidated into the North Dakota Bismarck Mission in 2015, which includes entire state of North Dakota. As of 2020, the mission was one of the larger missions in the LDS Church.

Temples

The Bismarck North Dakota Temple was dedicated on September 19, 1999, by LDS Church president Gordon B. Hinckley. It was built at a cost of $4 million.  The Watford City Ward in the Glendive Montana Stake is located in the Billings Montana Temple District. In 2020, a new statue of the Angel Moroni was installed on the temple to replace the weathered original statue.

See also
The Church of Jesus Christ of Latter-day Saints membership statistics (United States)
North Dakota: Religion

References

External links

 Newsroom (North Dakota)
 ComeUntoChrist.org Latter-day Saints Visitor site
 The Church of Jesus Christ of Latter-day Saints Official site

Latter Day Saint movement in North Dakota
North Dakota